More Love is the fifth studio album recorded by American country music artist Doug Stone. Released in 1993 on Epic Records, it features the singles "I Never Knew Love," "Addicted to a Dollar," and "More Love," all of which were Top Ten hits on the Billboard Hot Country Singles & Tracks (now Hot Country Songs) charts.

Content
"More Love" and "Dream High" were both featured on the soundtrack to the 1995 film Gordy, in which Stone starred.

Stone produced nine of the ten songs with James Stroud. The last song, "Dream High", was produced by Stroud along with Tom Bahler and Bruce Swedien.

Critical reception
Tom Roland of New Country magazine rated the album two stars out of five. His review criticized the album for "continu[ing] to mine the drippy side of Stone" through "manipulative" ballads, but cited "Addicted to a Dollar" and "Love, You Took Me by Surprise" as being "tougher" than Stone's previous works.

Track listing

Personnel
As listed in liner notes.
 Mike Brignardello – bass guitar
 Larry Byrom – acoustic guitar
 Glen Duncan – fiddle
 Paul Franklin – steel guitar, Dobro, pedabro
 Sonny Garrish – steel guitar, Dobro, pedabro
 Rob Hajacos – fiddle
 Dann Huff – electric guitar
 Larry Paxton – bass guitar
 Matt Rollings – piano
 Gary Smith – piano
 Joe Spivey – fiddle, mandolin
 Doug Stone – lead vocals
 Tim Veasey – piano
 Lonnie Wilson – drums
 Glenn Worf – bass guitar
 Curtis Wright – background vocals
 Curtis Young – background vocals

Chart performance

References

1993 albums
Epic Records albums
Doug Stone albums
Albums produced by James Stroud